The Apoquindo massacre, also known as the Apoquindo shootings, was an incident in Santiago, Chile, on October 21, 1993, in which eight people died after members of the Chilean left-wing guerrilla movement Movimiento Juvenil Lautaro robbed a Banco O'Higgins branch on Avenida Apoquindo, Las Condes, Santiago de Chile, where the bank guard was shot dead.

The assailants boarded a minibus that was intercepted by police officers of the Carabineros de Chile, sparking an assault that resulted in the death of a further seven persons: 3 attackers, 3 passengers on the bus and a police officer. A further 12 people were wounded.

Background 

Although by 1993 Chile had officially become a democracy, the Chilean military remained highly powerful and the Constitution of Chile ensured the continued influence of General Augusto Pinochet and his military commanders. This  prevented President Patricio Aylwin's government from achieving many of the goals it had set out to achieve, such as the restructuring of the Constitutional Court of Chile and the reduction of Pinochet's political power.  In spite of the severe limits imposed on Aylwin's government by the Constitution, over four years, it "altered power relations in its favor in the state, in civil society, and in political society." However, organizations including the Movimiento Juvenil Lautaro, the Manuel Rodríguez Patriotic Front and the Movimiento de Izquierda Revolucionaria continued to resist the Chilean government, either through nonviolent underground resistance or through armed resistance.

The Incident 
On October 21, 1993, a group of five members of the Lautaro guerrilla movement robbed a branch of Banco O'HIggins, located at Avenida Apoquindo 6417. According to the survivors, the purpose of the robbery was to seize funds for the rescue of political prisoners.

The robbers managed to escape on a minibus running on Santiago bus route 24-C, which was stopped by the police near Avenida Manquehue. Shooting broke out, in the course of which seven people, three robbers, three bus passengers and one policeman, were killed and 12 people were injured. Two police officers were arrested and prosecuted for making reckless use of their service weapons. According to ballistic tests, the minibus, in which there were more than 20 passengers, received between 162 and 300 bullet holes, according to differing sources.

Impact of events 
The government of the time, led by President Patricio Aylwin, endorsed the actions of the police. The senator Sergio Onofre Jarpa said, "this is like a war. They declared it and you have to face them at whatever cost."

Trial 
Eight years later, the military court handed down verdicts, sentencing the two survivors, Alvaro Gonzalez and Oriana Alcayaga, to a total of 81 years and 61 years imprisonment respectively.

Two Carabineros arrested in connection with the shootings later received suspended sentences of 541 and 240 days.

References 

Mass murder in 1993
Massacres in 1993
October 1993 events in South America
October 1993 crimes
Massacres in Chile
1993 in Chile
Political violence in Chile
Presidency of Patricio Aylwin